The Lusaka Accord (Portuguese: Acordo de Lusaka) was signed in Lusaka, Zambia, on 7 September 1974, between the Front for the Liberation of Mozambique (FRELIMO) and the Portuguese government that had been installed by the Carnation Revolution in Lisbon. In the agreement, Portugal formally recognized the right for Mozambique to have independence and agreed with FRELIMO the terms of the transference of powers. The agreement established that independence would be proclaimed after a transition period when administration of the country would be shared between the two parties. Mozambique became independent on 25 June 1975.

References

External links
 Wikisource: Acordo de Lusaka (in Portuguese)

See also
Carnation Revolution
Armed Forces Movement
Portuguese Colonial War
Alvor Agreement

 
Treaties concluded in 1974
Treaties entered into force in 1975
Treaties of the People's Republic of Mozambique
1974 in Portugal
1974 in Africa
Treaties of Portugal
Portuguese Colonial War